Palpita kimballi, or Kimball's palpita moth, is a moth in the family Crambidae. It was described by Eugene G. Munroe in 1959. It is found in North America, where it has been recorded from Alabama, Florida, Georgia, Louisiana, North Carolina, Oklahoma, South Carolina, Tennessee and Virginia.

The length of the forewings is 14–15 mm. The forewings are semi-translucent satin white, with a narrow orange streak along the costa. Adults are mainly on wing from July to October.

Etymology
The species is named for Charles P. Kimball, the author of The Lepidoptera of Florida: An Annotated Checklist.

References

Moths described in 1959
Palpita
Moths of North America